Hard Sell is an American comedy-drama written and directed by Sean Nalaboff in his directorial debut. The film stars Katrina Bowden, Skyler Gisondo, and Kristin Chenoweth, with Hannah Marks and Kevin Kilner in supporting roles.

Plot
The story centers around Hardy Buchanan (Skyler Gisondo), a poor high school senior surrounded by affluence at an elite private school, located on Long Island's Gold Coast. Hardy struggles to support his unstable mom (Kristin Chenoweth) and her prized possession, Walter, the family dog. When Walter gets sick, Hardy has to come up with fast cash to pay for the surgery. Alone and having no one to turn to, Hardy sides with Bo (Katrina Bowden), an aimless socialite. Hardy and Bo team up and discover ways of profiting off of the wayward teens at school with deep pockets and even heavier issues. The unlikely duo's new business takes a unique turn when the students learn that Bo has more to offer than what meets the eye as the characters get tossed headfirst into the lifestyles of the rich and dysfunctional. Hardy fights to save Walter and fix his broken family while Bo's past comes back to haunt her. As things begin to spiral out of control, Hardy has to make a decision to rebuild his life or to walk away.

Cast
 Katrina Bowden as Bo
 Skyler Gisondo as Hardy Buchanan
 Kristin Chenoweth as Lorna Buchanan, his mother
 Hannah Marks as Lake
 Jenna Leigh Green as Priscilla
 Kevin Kilner as Eddie
 Garrett Coffey as Jason

Release
On February 22, 2016, Variety reported that film studio Momentum Pictures (Entertainment One) had acquired the domestic rights to the film and planned for a limited theatrical release in spring 2016. The film was released on May 30, 2016.

References

External links
 

American teen comedy-drama films
2010s coming-of-age comedy-drama films
American coming-of-age comedy-drama films
American satirical films
American sex comedy films
2010s teen comedy-drama films
2016 films
2010s sex comedy films
2016 directorial debut films
2016 comedy films
2010s American films